Adriaenssen is a surname. Notable people with the surname include:

Alexander Adriaenssen (1587–1661), Flemish Baroque painter
Ben Adriaenssen (born 1989), Belgian sidecarcross rider
Emmanuel Adriaenssen (1554–1604), Flemish lutenist and composer
Vincent Adriaenssen (1595–1675), Flemish Baroque painter